Ian Lowell Crocker (born August 31, 1982) is an American former competition swimmer, five-time Olympic medalist, and former world record-holder.  During his career, he set world records in the 50- and 100-meter butterfly (long course and short course) and the 100-meter freestyle (short course).  He has won a total of twenty-one medals in major international competition, spanning the Olympics, the FINA World Aquatics Championships, and the Pan Pacific Swimming Championships. He coached for many years at the Western Hills Athletic Club and has helped coach the Longhorns swim camp in 2019 as well as other years. Since Spring of 2022 when the new facility opened, Crocker coaches at the Western Aquatics and Social Club at the Eanes Independent School District Aquatics center.

Career
Crocker, who specializes in the butterfly, has received five Olympic medals in his career. In addition to his accomplishments at the Olympics, Crocker was the first man to ever swim under 51 seconds in the 100-meter butterfly. Crocker improved his world record of 50.98 twice, down to a time of 50.40 set at the 2005 World Aquatics Championships in Montreal, before being bested by Michael Phelps in 2009.

2000-2001

At the 2000 Summer Olympics in Sydney, Crocker was a member of the gold medal-winning 400-meter medley relay team and barely missed winning a bronze in the 100-meter butterfly.

At the 2001 World Aquatics Championships, Crocker won a silver medal in the 100-meter butterfly, finishing behind Lars Frölander.

2003 World Aquatics Championships

At the 2003 World Aquatics Championships, Crocker won a total of three medals, two golds and one silver medal. In his first event, the 50-meter butterfly, Crocker won a silver medal finishing behind Australian Matt Welsh, who set the world record. Crocker is best known in these Championships for his world record performance in the 100 m butterfly final.  After the semi-finals of the 100-meter butterfly, it seemed Crocker was out of the gold medal position after Andrii Serdinov and Michael Phelps went under the former world record. However, in the final of the 100-meter butterfly, Crocker swam a 50.98 to become the first man under 51 seconds and win the gold medal. When Crocker saw the time after the race, he thought the world record belonged to Phelps. Crocker earned his final medal, a gold, in the 4×100-meter medley relay.  The American team recorded a time of 3:31.54 to beat the former world record set in 2002.

2004 Athens Summer Olympic Games

At the 2004 Summer Olympics in Athens, Crocker received a bronze medal as a member of the 400-meter freestyle relay team, a silver medal in the 100-meter butterfly, and a gold medal as a member of the world-record setting 400-meter medley relay team. Of the three medals he won at the 2004 Olympics, he is best remembered for his silver, as teammate Michael Phelps overtook him at the very end of the 100-meter butterfly to win the race by 0.04 seconds.  Traditionally, the Olympian who places highest in an individual event will be automatically given the corresponding leg of the 4×100-meter medley relay for the finals swim.  This gave Phelps an automatic entry into finals for the medley relay but he deferred that spot to the world record-holder and swam the butterfly leg in preliminary heats instead. Crocker had swum a slow leg leading off the 4×100-meter freestyle relay final, which may have cost the Americans a better medal, so Phelps' gesture gave Crocker a chance to make amends in a final.  Crocker and the American medley team went on to win the event in world record time. (Phelps still received a gold, since he had swum in the preliminary heat of the medley relay.)

2005 World Aquatics Championships

At the 2005 World Aquatics Championships, Crocker won a total of three medals, two golds and one silver medal.  In his first event, the 50 m butterfly, Crocker won a silver medal finishing behind South African Roland Schoeman, who set the world record. In the final of the 100 m butterfly, Crocker recorded a time of 50.40 to beat his own world record of 50.76 and win the gold medal. Crocker also handed Michael Phelps one of the worst losses in his career when Phelps finished over a second behind.  With this win, Crocker was awarded a spot in the 4 × 100 m medley relay.  Crocker did not disappoint and swam the butterfly leg in 50.39.  The American team went on to win the gold medal.

2007 World Aquatics Championships
At the 2007 World Aquatics Championships, Crocker won two silver medals.  In the 50-meter butterfly, Crocker won a silver medal finishing behind Schoeman. In the 100 m butterfly final, Crocker finished second to Phelps 50.82 to 50.77. In the heats of the 4×100-meter medley relay, Crocker dove in too early on an exchange, causing the disqualification of the American team.

2008 Beijing Summer Olympic Games

Crocker competed in his third Olympics as a medal contender for his signature 100-meter butterfly.  Many felt Crocker's career was on a slide due to a poor showing in the Olympic trials and having not broken the 51-second barrier in over 12 months.  Crocker finished in a tie for third in the semi-finals, behind Australia's Andrew Lauterstein.  In the finals, he finished fourth behind teammate Phelps, Milorad Čavić, and Lauterstein, beating Kenyan swimmer Jason Dunford.  He missed the medal stand by one hundredth of a second. Despite not earning a medal in his signature event, Crocker was given the opportunity to swim for the 4×100-meter medley relay in the preliminary heats. He earned a gold medal for his contribution.

2011 return to drug testing pool
In the third quarter of 2011, Ian Crocker returned to the USADA drug-testing pool. This fueled speculation that he might be considering a return to competitive swimming after more than three years away from the sport.

Personal

Crocker attended Cheverus High School in Portland, Maine.

Following the 2008 Beijing Olympic Games, he has taken a break and started a swim school with former Longhorn teammate Neil Walker.

He is now the head coach for a swim club in Austin, Texas, called the Whitecaps of Westlake (WOW).

See also

 List of multiple Olympic gold medalists
 List of multiple Olympic gold medalists in one event
 List of Olympic medalists in swimming (men)
 List of University of Texas at Austin alumni
 List of World Aquatics Championships medalists in swimming (men)
 World record progression 50 metres butterfly
 World record progression 100 metres freestyle
 World record progression 100 metres butterfly
 World record progression 4 × 100 metres medley relay

References

External links
 
 
 
 
 

1982 births
Living people
American male butterfly swimmers
American male freestyle swimmers
World record setters in swimming
Medalists at the FINA World Swimming Championships (25 m)
Medalists at the 2004 Summer Olympics
Medalists at the 2008 Summer Olympics
Olympic bronze medalists for the United States in swimming
Olympic gold medalists for the United States in swimming
Olympic silver medalists for the United States in swimming
Sportspeople from Portland, Maine
Swimmers at the 2000 Summer Olympics
Swimmers at the 2004 Summer Olympics
Swimmers at the 2008 Summer Olympics
Texas Longhorns men's swimmers
World Aquatics Championships medalists in swimming
Medalists at the 2000 Summer Olympics
Swimmers from Maine
Cheverus High School alumni